Kamongaron Reservoir is a reservoir in the village of Kamongaron, near the city of Urgut, Uzbekistan. It was built in 2015 by impounding the Kamongaronsoy river.

It fully meets the water needs of residents and farms of Kamongaron and Vagashti villages.

More than 17 billion 884 million sums were spent on the construction of the reservoir.

References 

Bodies of water of Uzbekistan